Allu Aravind (born 10 January 1949) is an Indian film producer and distributor in Telugu cinema under his banner Geetha Arts. He co-owns the Indian Super League club Kerala Blasters FC.

A part of the Allu–Konidela family, Aravind is the son of actor Allu Ramalingaiah. His sons are Allu Venkatesh, Allu Arjun and Allu Sirish. He is the maternal uncle of Ram Charan and brother-in-law of Chiranjeevi. Some of his notable works as a producer are Vijetha (1985), Master (1997), Ninaithen Vandhai (Tamil) (1998), Mangalyam Tantunanena (Kannada) (1998), Annayya (2000), Pellam Oorelithe (2003), Gangotri (2003), Johnny (2003), Bunny (2005), Jalsa (2008), Ghajini (2008), Magadheera (2009), Darling (2015) (Tamil), Sarrainodu and Dhruva (both in 2016). Apart from film production Geetha Arts has been into film distribution network as well. GA2 Pictures is an indie production arm of Geetha Arts which they produce small and medium budgeted movies. He won two Nandi Awards and one Filmfare Award. He is also a founder and co-owner of aha, a Telugu-streaming over-the-top service.

Early life 
Allu Aravind is born to Allu Ramalingaiah, former Telugu film actor, in Madras state of India. His sons Allu Arjun and Allu Sirish are Telugu film actors.His sister Surekha Konidala is the wife of famous Telugu film actor Chiranjeevi.

Filmography
As actor
 Hero (1984)
 Mahanagaramlo Mayagadu (1984)
 Chantabbai (1986)

As Producer

He has made many films in the last few years.  Jalsa, a Telugu film starring Pawan Kalyan grossed $10 million at the box office. Itof 2008 and the second highest grosser amongst Telugu films. Their next – Ghajini, a Bollywood movie starring Aamir Khan grossed over $45 million at box office, making it the highest grossing Indian film. The Magadheera, a big-budget swords and sandal epic that grossed $25 million at the box office. The movie was the highest-grossing Telugu film of 2009.

Telugu cinema

Hindi cinema

Kannada cinema

Tamil cinema

Awards and honours 
Nandi Awards
Best Home Viewing Feature Film - Pelli Sandadi
Best Popular Feature Film - MagadheeraMagadheera (2009)

Filmfare Awards South
Best Film - Telugu - MagadheeraMagadheera (2009)
Lifetime Achievement (2022)

Other Awards
Champions of Change Award in 2019, for his exceptional work in social welfare in the state of Andhra Pradesh. The award was conferred by Shri Pranab Mukherjee at Vigyan Bhavan New Delhi on 20 January 2020.
Santosham Dasari Smarakam Award (Producer) at 15th Santosham Film Awards.

Other works 
Allu Aravind is one of the minority stake holders of the football club Kerala Blasters FC that competes in the Indian Super League, the top tier of Indian Football. He is a key person and co-owner of aha, a Telugu-streaming over-the-top service.

References

External links

 
 

Living people
Film producers from Hyderabad, India
Telugu film producers
1947 births
Praja Rajyam Party politicians
Telugu politicians
Telangana politicians
Allu Aravind
Politicians from Hyderabad, India
Santosham Film Awards winners
Filmfare Awards South winners
Indian Hindus